Wasson is a surname. Notable people with the surname include:

 Craig Wasson (born 1954), American actor
 Daniel Wasson
 Dave Wasson, American television producer, director and screenwriter
 David Atwood Wasson (1823–1887), American minister and Transcendentalist author
 Dean Wasson
 Erin Wasson
 Ernie Wasson
 Gus Wasson, American NASCAR driver
 Isabel Bassett Wasson, American geologist and naturalist
James C. Wasson (1886-1966), American politician and member of the Mississippi House of Representatives
James R. Wasson (1847-1923), U.S. Army officer in Japan

 Jeremiah Richard Wasson (1855–1913), American military instructor in 19th century Japan
 Robert Gordon Wasson (1898–1986), American banker who became an expert on psilocybe mushrooms
 Thomas C. Wasson, American Consul General in Jerusalem, 1948
 William Wasson, American priest

See also 
 Wasson, Ojibwe leader
 Roy J. Wasson High School

English-language surnames